Shirkuh or Shir Kuh or ShirKooh in Iran may refer to:
 Shir Kuh, Gilan
 Shirkuh, Astaneh-ye Ashrafiyeh, Gilan Province
 Shirkuh, Qazvin
 Shir Kuh, a mountain in Yazd Province
 Shirkuh Rural District, in Yazd Province